Ceramica Cleopatra Football Club, is an Egyptian football club based in Giza, Egypt. 
The club is owned by Cleopatra Group, founded by Mohamed M. Abou El Enein.

Ceramica Cleopatra currently plays in the Egyptian Premier League, the highest league in the Egyptian football league system.

History
The club gained promotion from the Egyptian Third Division to the 2016–17 Egyptian Second Division, after finishing first in their group the 2015–16 season.

In the 2019–20 Egyptian Second Division, they finished 1st in Group B, to be promoted to the 2020–21 Egyptian Premier League for the first time in their history.

Current squad

References

Egyptian Second Division
Football clubs in Egypt
Sport in Giza
Association football clubs established in 2007
2007 establishments in Egypt